Abdulhakim Mohammed Sulaiman Al Tamimi,() is a Saudi politician. Since 17 June 2017, he has been the President and Minister of the General Authority of Civil Aviation. Prior to that, he served as Assistant Chairman of the Authority for Safety, Security and Air Transport at the General Authority of Civil Aviation and an Executive Member of the Council of the Arab Civil Aviation Authority.

References 

Living people
21st-century Saudi Arabian politicians
Year of birth missing (living people)